Zheleznodorozhny District is an administrative district (raion) of Central Okrug, one of the 10 raions of Novosibirsk, Russia. The area of the district is 8.3 sq km (2.5 sq mi). Population: 64 972 (2017).

History
The first houses were built here in 1893. At first, the district was named Vokzalnaya Chast.

In 1895 the Resettlement Center was established.

Kaganovichesky District was formed in 1936.

Novosibirsk Glavny Railway Station built in 1939.

In 1957 the Kaganovichesky District was renamed the Zheleznodorozhny District.

Streets

Architecture

Tsarist period

Soviet period

Post-Soviet period

Science and education
 Siberian Scientific Research Institute of Metrology
 Novosibirsk Medical College
 Novosibirsk Cooperative Technical School named after A. N. Kosygin
 Novosibirsk Special Music School
 Novosibirsk State Conservatoire named after M.I. Glinka
 Novosibirsk State Academy of Water Transportation Engineering
 Novosibirsk State Theater Institute

Medicine
 Novosibirsk Psychiatric Hospital No. 3

Religion

Christianity

Economy

Industry
 Noema is a sound equipment company.

Tourism

Hotels

Museums
 Nicholas Roerich Museum
 Museum of communication

Theatres

Parks

Narymsky Square

Transportation

Railway
Three railway stations are located in the district: Novosibirsk-Glavny, Tsentr and Pravaya Ob.

Metro
One Novosibirsk Metro station is located in the district: Ploshchad Garina-Mikhaylovskogo.

References